Ingvar Asp (born 2 October 1938) is a Swedish weightlifter. He competed in the men's middle heavyweight event at the 1964 Summer Olympics.

References

1938 births
Living people
Swedish male weightlifters
Olympic weightlifters of Sweden
Weightlifters at the 1964 Summer Olympics
Sportspeople from Lund
20th-century Swedish people